Raven is a census-designated place (CDP) in Russell and Tazewell counties in the U.S. state of Virginia. The population was 2,270 at the 2010 census.

Geography
According to the United States Census Bureau, the CDP has a total area of 6.8 square miles (17.7 km2), all land.

Demographics

As of the census of 2000, there were 2,593 people, 1,064 households, and 774 families residing in the CDP. The population density was 379.5 people per square mile (146.6/km2). There were 1,219 housing units at an average density of 178.4/sq mi (68.9/km2). The racial makeup of the CDP was 99.04% White, 0.04% African American, 0.08% Native American, and 0.85% from two or more races. Hispanic or Latino of any race were 0.77% of the population.

There were 1,064 households, out of which 30.6% had children under the age of 18 living with them, 55.5% were married couples living together, 13.1% had a female householder with no husband present, and 27.2% were non-families. 24.4% of all households were made up of individuals, and 11.7% had someone living alone who was 65 years of age or older. The average household size was 2.44 and the average family size was 2.88.

In the CDP, the population was spread out, with 23.1% under the age of 18, 9.1% from 18 to 24, 28.8% from 25 to 44, 26.3% from 45 to 64, and 12.6% who were 65 years of age or older. The median age was 37 years. For every 100 females, there were 94.5 males. For every 100 females age 18 and over, there were 91.1 males.

The median income for a household in the CDP was $19,104, and the median income for a family was $22,891. Males had a median income of $23,080 versus $19,327 for females. The per capita income for the CDP was $10,356. About 16.0% of families and 19.7% of the population were below the poverty line, including 25.6% of those under age 18 and 24.7% of those age 65 or over.

References

External links
 Raven tourism site

Census-designated places in Russell County, Virginia
Census-designated places in Tazewell County, Virginia
Census-designated places in Virginia
Coal towns in Virginia